

The Thule-Seminar is a far-right nationalist organization with strong Neopaganist roots based in Kassel, Germany. It was founded in 1980 by Pierre Krebs, essentially as the German branch of GRECE. Sometimes described as a think tank or "party of the mind", its name alludes to the Thule Society, one of the organizations that facilitated the rise of the Nazis and provided some of the intellectual cadre for the latter.

It describes itself as a "research society for Indo-European culture". On its homepage, it deplores the formation of a "multiracial, i.e. monoprimitive" society in the "ethnosuicidal" cultures of Europe and declares its aim to be the formation of "metapolitical" ("metapo") cells across Europe. As emblems, it uses the Black Sun, as well as the combined Tiwaz rune and Sig rune.

Its ideology has been described as based on the Conservative revolution and including elements of anti-Americanism, anti-Zionism and being close to apartheid.

The first major publication of the Seminar was Das unvergängliche Erbe. Alternativen zum Prinzip der Gleichheit (translation: "The Everlasting Heritage: Alternatives to the Principle of Equality"), edited by Krebs and published in 1981 by Grabert Verlag; notably, the preface of this volume was written by Hans Jürgen Eysenck. It turned out to be the "programmatic" book of the Seminar. The Thule-Seminar publishes a journal called Elemente and another one called Metapo.

See also 
 Nouvelle Droite

References

Further reading 
 
 Verena Rick, (14 May 1982) Der Sumpf ist fruchtbar noch. Die „Neue Rechte“ stellt sich vor. Das unvergängliche Erbe“ – Die erste Publikation des „Thule-Seminars“, Die Zeit, p. 48

External links 
 

New Right (Europe)
Modern pagan organisations based in Germany
Religious organizations established in 1980
Modern pagan organizations established in the 1980s
Political and economic think tanks based in Germany